Government House was built between 1902 and 1906 as the official residence of the governor of the Transvaal Colony.

The Cape vernacular style was taken on as a national building style promoted not only by the Cape coteries but also by proponents of Dutch-speaking republican independence or of Afrikaner nationalism, notably the Dutch Pretoria artist Jacobus Hendrik Pierneef. Over the next few decades most public buildings in South Africa were designed with versions of Cape Dutch gables, with fanlights, mullioned windows, and brass escutcheons, to differing degrees of cost and credibility.

See also
Government Houses of South Africa
Government Houses of the British Empire
Governors General of South Africa

Government buildings completed in 1906
Houses completed in 1906
Official residences in South Africa
Buildings and structures in Pretoria
Government Houses of the British Empire and Commonwealth
1906 establishments in South Africa
20th-century architecture in South Africa